Agafon is a Russian Christian male first name. The name is derived from the Greek word agathon, meaning kindness, goodness. Variants of this name used by the common people include Agafony, Ogafon, Ogofon, and Ogafony. Other colloquial forms include Gapon and Gafon. The substandard colloquial form Agapon was also used.

The diminutives of "Agafon" are Aga, Gafa, and Gasha, as well as Agafonka, Agafonya, Afonya, Fonya, Agafosha, Fosha, Aganya, Agasha, Agaposha, Gaposha, and Gapa. Also used rarely are Gafya and Gafka.

The patronymics derived from "Agafon" are "" (Agafonovich; masculine) and its colloquial form "" (Agafonych), and "" (Agafonovna; feminine).

"Agaton" is the Westernized form of this first name.

Last names derived from this first name include Agafonov and possibly Agin, Agish, and Agishev.

References

Notes

Sources
[1] А. В. Суперанская (A. V. Superanskaya). "Современный словарь личных имён: Сравнение. Происхождение. Написание" (Modern Dictionary of First Names: Comparison. Origins. Spelling). Айрис-пресс. Москва, 2005. 
[2] А. В. Суперанская (A. V. Superanskaya). "Словарь русских имён" (Dictionary of Russian Names). Издательство Эксмо. Москва, 2005. 
Н. А. Петровский (N. A. Petrovsky). "Словарь русских личных имён" (Dictionary of Russian First Names). ООО Издательство "АСТ". Москва, 2005. 
Ю. А. Федосюк (Yu. A. Fedosyuk). "Русские фамилии: популярный этимологический словарь" (Russian Last Names: a Popular Etymological Dictionary). Москва, 2006. 
И. М. Ганжина (I. M. Ganzhina). "Словарь современных русских фамилий" (Dictionary of Modern Russian Last Names). Москва, 2001. 

